Alcetas was king of the ancient Greek kingdom of Macedonia. He was a member of the Argead dynasty and son of Aeropus I. By allowing thirty years for the span of an average generation from the beginning of Archelaus' reign in 413 BC, British historian Nicholas Hammond estimated that Aeropus ruled around 533 BC.

According to Herodotus and Thucydides, Alcetas was the fifth king of Macedonia. However, a much later tradition records Caranus as the founder of Macedonia and therefore Alcetas as the eighth king. This unhistorical assertion is almost universally rejected by moderns scholarship as propaganda invented at the Argead court during the reign of Philip II.

By all accounts, Alcetas was a calm and stable ruler, who sought to preserve his kingdom through peaceful means. Unlike his predecessors, he apparently did not engage in unnecessary warfare in order to extend the boundaries of his kingdom. His wife is unknown, but he was the father of Amyntas I.

References

Notes

Citations

See also 
List of ancient Macedonians

547 BC deaths
6th-century BC Macedonian monarchs
Argead kings of Macedonia
Year of birth unknown